Thomas Warren (fl. 1727–1767) was an English bookseller, printer, publisher and businessman.

Thomas Warren may also refer to:

Thomas Warren (cricketer) (1859–1936), English cricketer for Leicestershire
Thomas Warren (MP) (died 1591), Member of Parliament (MP) for Dover
Thomas Warren (priest) (1831–1891), Anglican priest
Thomas Warren (Royal Navy officer) (died 1699), British commodore
Thomas B. Warren (1920–2000), professor of philosophy of religion and apologetics at the Harding School of Theology in Memphis, Tennessee
Thomas Herbert Warren (1853–1930), English academic and administrator
Tom Warren (rugby union) (born 1983), rugby union player
Tom Warren (triathlete) (born 1943), American triathlete
Tommy Warren (1917–1968), baseball player
Tommy G. Warren, American screenwriter, director and producer